Sprint 2 is a two player overhead-view arcade racing video game released in 1976 by Kee Games, a wholly owned subsidiary of Atari, and distributed by Namco in Japan. While earlier driving games had computer-controlled cars that moved along a "canned predetermined" course, Sprint 2 "introduced the concept of a computer car that had the intelligence to drive itself around the track" in "a semi-intelligent" manner.

Technology
Sprint 2 evolved from Gran Trak 10 and Gran Trak 20, but included a microprocessor (the 6502), a first for racing games.  This allowed Sprint 2 to include two computer-controlled cars, better graphics, and more tracks.  Unlike Gran Trak, this machine did not have brake pedals, but the players could still make their cars "fishtail" by turning their steering wheels abruptly.

Reception
In the United States, Sprint 2 was the second highest-earning arcade video game of 1977, below Sea Wolf. It was also second highest-earning arcade video game of 1978, below Space Wars, along with Sprint 1 in third place. Sprint 2 was later the third highest-earning arcade video game of 1979, below Space Invaders and Atari Football.

The game was a commercial success for Namco in Japan, where Sprint 2 was the seventh highest-earning arcade video game of 1977. It was also among the year's top four highest-earning racing video games, below Taito's Speed Race DX and Road Champion, and tied with Taito's Super High-Way.

Legacy
Sprint 2 was the first in a long series of games, some of which bore its name into the 1980s:
 Sprint 4 and Sprint 8, a 4 player and 8 player version respectively, were released in 1977.  Both were full color raster versions of the game.
 Sprint 1 was released in 1978.  The "1" and "2" designations reflect the number of players, rather than indicating it was a prequel.
 Super Sprint, a 3 player version with updated graphics, was released by Atari Games in 1986.
 Championship Sprint, a 2 player version of Super Sprint, was released by Atari Games in 1986.
 Badlands, a 2 player post-apocalyptic setting update of Championship Sprint, was released in 1989.

Sprint 2 was one of the first Atari products to feature the now well-known "Atari arcade font" (first introduced in the Quiz Show).

In 2016 a reverse engineered version to JavaScript became available.

References

External links 
 Commentary from GameSpy
 Commentary from Phosphor Dot Fossils

 Entry at the Arcade Flyer Archive
 Sprint 2 at ArcadeStuff
 Sprint 2 at GameFAQs

1976 video games
Arcade video games
Arcade-only video games
Atari arcade games
North America-exclusive video games
Top-down racing video games
Multiplayer and single-player video games
Video games developed in the United States